= Kili Faqiran =

Village in Balochistan, Pakistan

Kili Faqiran is a remote village in Balochistan province south-western Pakistan. The village gained notoriety when Ghulam Nabi, a resident of the village, was filmed being beheaded by a twelve-year-old on behalf of the Taliban
